The Pusta River is a river in southern Serbia, a 71-km long left tributary to the South Morava. It also gives the name to the Pusta Reka region in its valley.

River 

It flows eastward, between the mountains of Radan (to the south) and Pasjača (to the north), next to the villages of Dobra Voda, Magaš, Brestovac and Velika Crkvica, before it reaches the regional center of Bojnik, after which, for the rest of the course of 46 km, it is known as the Pusta River. From Bojnik, the river bends north, next to the villages of Dragovac, Pridvorica, Đinđuša, Lapotince, Kacabać, Kosančić, Donje Brijanje, Međa and Draškovac, before it empties into the South Morava, near the village of Pukovac.

The Pusta River drains an area of 590 km2, belongs to the Black Sea drainage basin, and is not navigable.

Region 

The region of Pusta Reka mostly correspondence with the river's watershed. It is located between the Pasjača mountain and lower Toplica region (on the north), the Southern Pomoravlje (on the east), the Jablanica region (on the south) and the Radan mountain (on the west).

The region is an agricultural area, almost without any industry, except for some smaller facilities in regional center, Bojnik. As if it confirms the name of the river (Pusta reka in Serbian means 'Desolate river'), the region is economically undeveloped and poor, sparsely populated and depopulating (18,801 inhabitants in 1971 or 71 per km2; 13,118 in 2002 or 50 per km2).

References 

 Mala Prosvetina Enciklopedija, Third edition (1985); Prosveta; 
 Jovan Đ. Marković (1990): Enciklopedijski geografski leksikon Jugoslavije; Svjetlost-Sarajevo; 

Rivers of Serbia